The women's 200-metre backstroke event at the 2012 Summer Olympics took place on 2–3 August at the London Aquatics Centre in London, United Kingdom.

U.S. teenage sensation Missy Franklin blistered the field with a remarkable world record in textile to strike a backstroke double for the first time, since Romania's Diana Mocanu did so in 2000. Dominating the race from the start, she threw down a sterling time of 2:04.06 to broaden a full-body length gap over the rest of the field and to slice three-quarters of a second (0.75) off the previous record set by Zimbabwe's Kirsty Coventry in a now-banned polyurethane bodysuit from the 2009 World Championships. Russia's Anastasia Zuyeva cleared a 2:06-barrier to take the silver in 2:05.92, while Franklin's teammate Elizabeth Beisel snatched the bronze in 2:06.55, handing over an entire medal haul for the Americans with a one-three finish.

Backed by a raucous home crowd, Great Britain's Elizabeth Simmonds fell short of the podium with a fourth-place time in 2:07.26. Australia's Meagan Nay finished fifth in 2:07.43, while Coventry, a two-time Olympic champion, missed a chance to produce another historic three-peat as she claimed a distant sixth spot in 2:08.18. France's Alexianne Castel (2:08.43) and Canada's Sinead Russell (2:09.86) closed out the championship field.

Records
Prior to this competition, the existing world and Olympic records were as follows.

The following records were established during the competition:

Results

Heats

Semifinals

Semifinal 1

Semifinal 2

Final

References

External links
NBC Olympics Coverage

Women's 00200 metre backstroke
2012 in women's swimming
Women's events at the 2012 Summer Olympics